O Homem Que Deve Morrer is a Brazilian telenovela produced and broadcast by Rede Globo. It premiered on 14 June 1971 and ended on 8 April 1972, with a total of 258 episodes. It is the tenth "novela das oito" to be aired on the timeslot. It was created and written by Janete Clair, and directed by Daniel Filho and Milton Gonçalves.

Cast 
 Tarcísio Meira - Cyro Valdez
 Glória Menezes - Ester
 Jardel Filho - Otto Frederico von Müller
 Cláudio Cavalcanti - Baby Liberato
 Dina Sfat - Vanda Vidal
 Paulo José - André
 Gilberto Martinho - Mestre Jonas
 Waldir Onofre - Pedrão
 Betty Faria - Inês
 Edney Giovenazzi - Ricardo
 Emiliano Queiroz - Dr. Paulus
 Arlete Salles - Lia
 Zilka Salaberry - Bárbara
 Ênio Santos - Professor Valdez
 Neuza Amaral - Orjana
 Lídia Mattos - Catarina
 Macedo Neto - Commander  Liberato
 Ida Gomes - Júlia
 Carlos Eduardo Dolabella - Cesário
 Lúcia Alves - Tula
 Álvaro Aguiar - Max
 Ana Ariel - Rosa
 Suzana Faini - Sônia
 Antonio Pitanga - Lucas Pé-na-Cova
 Léa Garcia - Luana
 Ruth de Souza - Das Dores
 Ivan Cândido - Godoy
 Arnaldo Weiss - Professor Zacarias
 Tânia Scher - Beth
 Zeny Pereira - Conceição
 Dary Reis - Valter Coice-de-Mula
 Miriam Pires - Carolina
 Fernando José - Almeida
 Lícia Magna - Clara
 Ângela Leal - Ângela
 Monah Delacy - Cândida
 Francisco Serrano - Dr. Gustavo
 Paulo César Pereio - Dr. Roberto
 Vinícius Salvatori - Delegado
 Jorge Cherques - Werner Von Müller

References

External links 
 

TV Globo telenovelas
1971 telenovelas
Brazilian telenovelas
1971 Brazilian television series debuts
1972 Brazilian television series endings
Portuguese-language telenovelas